is a Japanese manga series written and illustrated by Haruko Kashiwagi. It has been serialized in Shogakukan's seinen manga magazine Weekly Big Comic Spirits since March 2014. A ten-episode television drama adaptation, known as Caseworker's Diary – Constitutional Rights, was broadcast on Fuji TV from July to September 2018.

In 2019, the manga won the 64th Shogakukan Manga Award in the general category.

Characters

Media

Manga
Kenkō de Bunkateki na Saitei Gendo no Seikatsu, written and illustrated by Haruko Kashiwagi, started in Shogakukan's seinen manga magazine Weekly Big Comic Spirits on March 31, 2014. Shogakukan has collected its chapters into individual tankōbon volumes. The first volume was released on August 29, 2014. As of February 28, 2022, eleven volumes have been released.

Volume list

Drama
A ten-episode television drama adaptation, known in English as Caseworker's Diary – Constitutional Rights, was broadcast on Fuji TV from July 17, to September 18, 2018. The series' opening theme is "Tomorrow", performed by AAA.

Reception
As of May 14, 2018, the Kenkō de Bunkateki na Saitei Gendo no Seikatsu manga had 500,000 copies in circulation. 

The manga was one of the Jury Recommended Works at the 19th and 23rd Japan Media Arts Festival in 2015 and 2020, respectively. In 2019, the manga, along with Hibiki: Shōsetsuka ni Naru Hōhō, won the 64th Shogakukan Manga Award in the general category. It was also nominated for the 23rd Tezuka Osamu Cultural Prize in 2019.

References

Further reading

External links
  
  
 
 

Fuji TV dramas
Seinen manga
Shogakukan manga
Winners of the Shogakukan Manga Award for general manga